The 1960 Kerry Senior Football Championship was the 60th staging of the Kerry Senior Football Championship since its establishment by the Kerry County Board in 1889.

John Mitchels entered the championship as the defending champions.

The final was played on 9 April 1961 between John Mitchels and West Kerry, in what was their first ever meeting in the final. John Mitchels won the match by 1-11 to 0-03 to claim their sixth championship title overall and a second title in succession.

Results

Final

Miscellaneous

 West Kerry qualify for the final for the first time.

References

Kerry Senior Football Championship
1960 in Gaelic football